Raymond Neil (October 12, 1920 – July 10, 1998), nicknamed "Aussa" and "Tackolu", was an American Negro league second baseman in the 1940s and 1950s.

A native of Apopka, Florida, Neil played his entire career for the Indianapolis Clowns franchise, beginning in the early 1940s when the barnstorming club was known as the Ethiopian Clowns. Neil was selected to play in the East–West All-Star Game in 1947, 1951 and 1953. He went 3-for-3 in the 1953 game, and was among the league's top batters that season. Neil died in St. Joseph, Michigan in 1998 at age 77.

References

External links
 and Seamheads

1920 births
1998 deaths
Indianapolis Clowns players
20th-century African-American sportspeople
Baseball infielders